Utagawa Toyoharu (歌川 豊春,  – 1814) was a Japanese artist in the ukiyo-e genre, known as the founder of the Utagawa school and for his uki-e pictures that incorporated Western-style geometrical perspective to create a sense of depth.

Born in Toyooka in Tajima Province, Toyoharu first studied art in Kyoto, then in Edo (modern Tokyo), where from 1768 he began to produce designs for ukiyo-e woodblock prints. He soon became known for his  "floating pictures" of landscapes and famous sites, as well as copies of Western and Chinese perspective prints. Though his were not the first perspective prints in ukiyo-e, they were the first to appear as full-colour nishiki-e, and they demonstrate a much greater mastery of perspective techniques than the works of his predecessors.  Toyoharu was the first to make the landscape a subject of ukiyo-e art, rather than just a background to figures and events.  By the 1780s he had turned primarily to painting.  The Utagawa school of art grew to dominate ukiyo-e in the 19th century with artists such as Utamaro, Hiroshige, and Kuniyoshi.

Life and career

Utagawa Toyoharu was born  in Toyooka in Tajima Province.  He studied in Kyoto under  of the Kanō school of painting.  It may have been around 1763 that he moved to Edo (modern Tokyo), where he studied under Toriyama Sekien.  The Toyo in the art name Toyoharu is said to have come from Sekien's personal name Toyofusa.  Some sources hold he also studied under Ishikawa Toyonobu and Nishimura Shigenaga.  Other art names Toyoharu went under include Ichiryūsai, Senryūsai, and Shōjirō.  Tradition holds that the name Utagawa derives from Udagawa-chō, where Toyoharu lived in the Shiba district in Edo.  His common name was Tajimaya Shōjirō, and he also used the personal names Masaki and Shin'emon.

Toyoharu's work began to appear about 1768.  His earliest work includes woodblock prints in a refined, delicate style of beauties and actors.  Soon he began to produce  "floating picture" perspective prints, a genre in which Toyoharu applied Western-style one-point perspective to create a realistic sense of depth.  Most were of famous sites, including theatres, temples, and teahouses.  Toyoharu's were not the first uki-e—Okumura Masanobu had made such works since the early 1740s, and claimed the genre's origin for himself.  Toyoharu's were the first uki-e in the full-colour  genre that had developed in the 1760s.  Several of his prints were based on imported prints from the West or China.

From the 1780s Toyoharu appears to have dedicated himself to painting, and also produced kabuki programs and billboards after 1785.  He headed the painters involved in the restoration of Nikkō Tōshō-gū in 1796.  He died in 1814 and was buried in Honkyōji Temple in Ikebukuro under the Buddhist posthumous name Utagawa-in Toyoharu Nichiyō Shinji.

Style

Toyoharu's works have a gentle, calm, and unpretentious touch, and display the influence of ukiyo-e masters such as Ishikawa Toyonobu and Suzuki Harunobu.  Harunobu pioneered the full-colour  print and was particularly popular and influential in the 1760s, when Toyoharu first began his career.

Toyoharu produced a number of willowy, graceful  portraits of beauties in  pillar prints.  Only about fifteen examples of his  are known, almost all from his earliest period.  One of the better-known examples of Toyoharu's work in this style is a four-sheet set depicting the Chinese ideal of the four arts.  Toyoharu produced a small number of  actor prints that, in contrast to the works of the leading Katsukawa school, are executed in the learned style of an Ippitsusai Bunchō.

While Toyoharu trained in Kyoto he may have been exposed to the works of Maruyama Ōkyo, whose popular megane-e were pictures in one-point perspective meant to be viewed in a special box in the manner of the French vue d'optique.  Toyoharu may also have seen the Chinese vue d'optique prints made in the 1750s that inspired Ōkyo's work.

These early examples were inconsistent in their application of perspective techniques, and the results can be unconvincing; Toyoharu's were much more dextrous, though not strict—he manipulated it to allow the representation of figures and objects that otherwise would have been obscured. Toyoharu's works helped pioneer the landscape as an ukiyo-e subject, rather than merely a background for human figures or events, as in Masanobu's works.

Several of Toyoharu's prints were imitations of imported prints of famed European locations, some of which were Western and others Chinese imitations of Western prints.  The titles were often fictional: The Bell which Resounds for Ten Thousand Leagues in the Dutch Port of Frankai is an imitation of a print of the Grand Canal of Venice from 1742 by Antonio Visentini, itself based on a painting by Canaletto.  Toyoharu titled another A Perspective View of French Churches in Holland, though he based it on a print of the Roman Forum.  Toyoharu took licence with other details of foreign lands, such as having the Dutch swim in their canals.  Japanese and Chinese mythology were also frequent subjects in Toyoharu's  prints, the foreign perspective technique giving such prints an exotic feel.

In his  paintings the influence of Toyonobu can seem strong, but in his seals on these paintings Toyoharu proclaims himself a pupil of Sekien.  His efforts contributed to the development of the Rinpa school.  His paintings have joined the collections of foreign museums such as the British Museum, Museum of Fine Arts, Boston, and the Freer Gallery of Art.  His paintings include  folding screens—a genre in which ukiyo-e is said to have its origins, but was rare in ukiyo-e after the development of nishiki-e prints.  A six-panel example of a spring scene in Yoshiwara resides in France in a private collection.

Legacy

The popularity of Toyoharu's work peaked in the 1770s.  By the 19th century, Western-style perspective techniques had ceased to be a novelty and had been absorbed into Japanese artistic culture, deployed by such artists as Hokusai and Hiroshige, two artists best remembered for their landscapes, a genre Toyoharu pioneered.

The Utagawa school that Toyoharu founded was to become one of the most influential, and produced works in a far greater variety of genres than any other school.  His students included Toyokuni and Toyohiro; Toyohiro worked in the style of his master, while Toyokuni, who headed the school from 1814, became a prominent and prolific producer of yakusha-e prints of kabuki actors.  Other well-known members of the school were Utamaro, Hiroshige, Kuniyoshi, and Kunisada.  Though Japanese art schools, such as the Katsukawa in ukiyo-e and the Kanō in painting, emphasized a uniformity of style, a general style in the Utagawa school is not easy to recognize aside from a concern with realism and facial expressiveness.  The school dominated ukiyo-e production by the mid-19th century, and most of the artists—such as Kobayashi Kiyochika—who documented the modernization of Japan during the Meiji period during ukiyo-e's declining years belonged to the Utagawa school.

The Torii school lasted longer, but the Utagawa school had more adherents.  It fostered closer master–student relations and more systematized training than in other schools.  Excepting a few prominent examples, such as Hiroshige or Kuniyoshi, the later generations of artists tended to lack stylistic diversity, and their work has become emblematic of ukiyo-e's decline in the 19th century.

Toyoharu also taught painting. His most prominent student was Sakai Hōitsu.

As of 2014, studies into Toyoharu's work have not been carried out in depth. Cataloguing and analyzing his work and his and his publishers' seals was still in its infancy. However, his work is kept in a variety of museums, including the Carnegie Museum of Art, National Museum of Asian Art, the Maidstone Museum, the Worcester Art Museum, the Fine Arts Museum of San Francisco, the Minneapolis Institute of Art, the Portland Art Museum, the Museum of Fine Arts, Boston, the Metropolitan Museum of Art, the University of Michigan Museum of Art, the Princeton University Art Museum, and the Asian Art Museum in San Francisco.

See also
 List of Utagawa school members

Notes

References

Works cited

Further reading

External links

 

1735 births
1814 deaths
Ukiyo-e artists
Toyoharu
Artists from Hyōgo Prefecture
18th-century Japanese artists
19th-century Japanese artists